Battery A, 1st Illinois Light Artillery Regiment, originally known as "Smith's Chicago Light Artillery," was an artillery battery that served in the Union Army during the American Civil War.

Service
Battery A was mustered into service at Chicago, Illinois on April 17, 1861 for three months state service.  The battery was reorganized for three years Federal service as Battery A on July 16, 1861.

The battery was mustered out on July 3, 1865.

Total strength and casualties
The battery lost 15 enlisted men who were killed in action or who died of their wounds and 22 enlisted men who died of disease, for a total of 37 fatalities.

Commanders
Captain James Smith - resigned November 27, 1861.
Captain Charles M. Willard - promoted to major.
Captain Francis Morgan  - mustered out May 24, 1862.
Captain Peter P. Wood  - mustered out July 23, 1864.

See also
List of Illinois Civil War Units
Illinois in the American Civil War

References

Further reading
Kimbell, Charles  Bill. History of Battery "A," First Illinois Light Artillery Volunteers. Chicago, Cushing Printing Company, 1899.

External links

 The History of Battery A, 1st Illinois Light Artillery
The Civil War Archive: Illinois Artillery

1861 establishments in Illinois
Military units and formations established in 1861
Military units and formations disestablished in 1865
Units and formations of the Union Army from Illinois
Artillery units and formations of the American Civil War